The 2019 Copa de la Superliga Argentina (named Copa de la Superliga YPF Infinia 2019 due to sponsorship by YPF) was the first edition of the Copa de la Superliga Argentina, Argentina's football league cup competition open to all 26 participants in the Superliga Argentina for the 2018–19 season. The competition was planned by the Executive Committee of the Superliga Argentina throughout 2018 with a final approval being given on 12 December 2018, and was played from 12 April to 2 June 2019, after the conclusion of the Superliga season.

Tigre were the champions, beating Boca Juniors by a 2–0 score in the final match played at Estadio Mario Alberto Kempes in Córdoba.

Format
The competition was played as a knockout tournament in its entirety, with the top six teams in the 2018–19 Superliga season receiving byes to the round of 16, and the remaining 20 teams starting the competition in the first round, where they were paired into 10 ties according to their league placement, with the winners advancing to the round of 16. Matchups in all rounds prior to the final were played as two-legged ties, with the team with the best placement in the league season hosting the second leg, whilst the final was played as a single match at a neutral ground.

If teams were tied on aggregate in all rounds prior to the final, the away goals rule was used. If still tied, a penalty shoot-out was used to determine the winner. In the final, 30 minutes of extra time would be played if both teams were tied, and if still tied at the end of extra time, the champions would be determined in a penalty shoot-out.

As champions, Tigre qualified for the group stage of the 2020 Copa Libertadores, with the runners-up being entitled to a berth to the 2020 Copa Sudamericana. However, that berth was passed to semifinalists Argentinos Juniors since runners-up Boca Juniors as well as the other semifinalist Atlético Tucumán qualified for the Copa Libertadores.

Schedule
The competition schedule was unveiled by the Superliga Argentina on 27 March 2019.

Seeding
Teams were seeded 1–26 according to their placements in the Superliga Argentina season. Seeds 1–6 received a bye to the round of 16, and seeds 7–26 played the competition from the first round.

First round
The 20 teams placed from seventh to twenty-sixth in the 2018–19 Superliga Argentina played in the first round of the competition. The higher-seeded team in each tie played the second leg at home.

|}

First leg

Second leg

Bracket

Round of 16
The top six teams in the 2018–19 Superliga Argentina season entered the competition in this round, joining the 10 first round winners. The higher-seeded team in each tie played the second leg at home.

|}

First leg

Second leg

Quarterfinals
The higher-seeded team in each tie played the second leg at home.

|}

First leg

Second leg

Semifinals
The higher-seeded team in each tie played the second leg at home.

|}

First leg

Second leg

Final

Statistics

Top goalscorers 

Source: AFA

Awards
The following players were rewarded for their performances during the tournament.

Best coach:  Néstor Gorosito (Tigre)
Best player:  Walter Montillo (Tigre)
Topscorer:  Javier Toledo (Atlético Tucumán)

References

External links
 Superliga Argentina official website

Argentina
2019 in Argentine football